Triple lock may refer to:
 Smith & Wesson Triple Lock, double-action revolver
 The method of determining the annual increase in the UK Basic State Pension
 Triple Lock mechanism (Liberal Democrats), requirements for the party leader to enter coalition government
 Triple lock (Irish Defence Forces) legal requirements for deployment abroad of Irish troops